David Arthur Skinner (born 3 January 1980) is a British pianist, bandleader, and composer. Skinner was born on the Isle of Wight.

Discography

Solo albums 
2013: Diagonal Jazz (Pling Music), solo piano
2015: Cubistic Boogie (Losen Records), solo piano
2017: Skinner plays Skinner (Losen Records), solo piano

Collaborations 
 Within Sphinx
 1999: Sphinx
 2001: Speaks the Riddle of the Undisputed Truth (Acoustica)
 2003: Live at Cloitre des Carmes, Avignon
 2006: Brutte Traader – Poems of Bjarne Andreassen (Japanese release)
 2007: Bohemian Sketches (Aim Records)
 2011: Harmonogram (Pling Music)

 With The Heavy Horns
2003: Mine's Bigger Than Yours

 With Laura Fowles
 2003: David Skinner and Laura Fowles Duo (Yorkshire Arts Council)

 Within Øyvind Gravdal Band
 2005  In The Tree (Ponca Jazz)

 With Anders Lønne Grønseth
 2006: Phantasmagoria (Aim Records)
 2009: Arc en ciel (Pling Music)
 2013: At Swing Audio (Pling Music)

With Kristoffer Kompen
 2013: A Tribute to Jack Teagarden (Herman Records)

References

External links
 

Avant-garde jazz musicians
English jazz pianists
English jazz composers
English male composers
Grieg Academy alumni
University of Bergen alumni
1980 births
Living people
Musicians from Kent